The Man o' War Cup, originally the Kenilworth Gold Cup, is a solid gold trophy that commemorates the winners of the Travers Stakes, held at Saratoga Race Course in Saratoga Springs, New York. Winners of the Travers, affectionately called the "Mid-Summer Derby" and the oldest continuously-run grade one stakes race in the United States, have their name inscribed on the original and receive a gold-plated replica of the Cup.

The Cup is named after the 1920 winner of the Stakes race, Man o' War. Man o' War went on to defeat the famed Sir Barton, the first winner of the American  Triple Crown, at a special match race at Kenilworth Park in Windsor, Ontario. It was for that race that Samuel D. Riddle received the trophy, which was later donated to Saratoga by Mrs. Sam (Elizabeth) Riddle in 1936. William Woodward's Granville won the 1936 Travers Stakes and was the first to be presented with the Cup. The cup was designed by Tiffany & Co. for Abe Orpen, owner and manager of Kenilworth, at a cost of $5,000, for the famous match race.

Saratoga Race Course has several longstanding traditions that include the yearly presentation of the Man O’ War Cup, which is also known as the "Travers Trophy." and is presented after the annual renewal of the signature race of the summer meet at America's oldest racecourse. Each year the original gold trophy is presented by a member of the Riddle family and either the Governor or Lt. Governor of the State of New York. A replica is made each year and that gold-plated smaller version of the permanent trophy is given for permanent possession to the owners of the winning horse.

Another unique fixture of any Travers Stakes is the canoe that sits in an infield lake at Saratoga Race Course. Every year, the colors of the winner of the Travers Stakes are painted on the canoe as lasting semblance for the winner and stays there throughout the year until a new winner is crowned. Winning jockeys are also immortalized with a lawn jockey statue custom-painted in the silk colors of the winning owner to be displayed at the racecourse entrance for the next year. Lawn Jockey statues are said to bring good luck to all but especially the winning jockey for that next year's mounts. Another tradition of the "Mid-summer Derby" is a blanket of red and white carnations that is draped over the withers of the winner. That blanket is red in color outlined with a fringe of white carnation and a large "T" also in white.

See also
August Belmont Trophy

References 

Horse racing in the United States
Saratoga Race Course
Horse racing awards
American horse racing trophies